Invercargill Marist Rugby Football Club is an amateur New Zealand rugby union club based in the Southland Region of New Zealand. Their senior team plays in the Southlandwide Premier Division for the Galbraith Shield. The club boasts one of the most loyal supporters groups in the region which can be credited to Peter D Grace, the founder of the Supporters Club. The current team captained by former New Zealand Under-20 representative Scott Eade features five current Southland representatives. The local patron of the rugby club is Nathan "Birdman" Burgess.

Club Honours
The Marist club has produced numerous Southland representatives and five All Blacks, the most recent being Paul Henderson in the 1990s.

Galbraith Shield Wins (7): 1940, 1948, 1957, 1979, 2001, 2017, 2018

Club All Blacks:
J.A McRae - 1946
L.S Connolly - 1947
W.A McCaw - 1951-54
F.J Oliver 1976-77
P.W Henderson 1989-93

New Zealand XV:
M.P Grace 1939-45

Junior All Blacks/New Zealand Under-20:
K.J McRae - 1967-68
F.J Oliver - 1969
S Eade - 2011-12
T Raimona - 2012
F Thomas - 2018

New Zealand Maori:
H MacDonald - 2004

New Zealand Under 17:
J Templar - 1991

New Zealand Marist:
I Sipa - 1998
S Ripley - 1998

References

Southland Rugby Clubs Page
https://web.archive.org/web/20090214005442/http://rugbysouthland.co.nz/index.php?pageLoad=28&par=7

New Zealand rugby union teams
Sport in Invercargill
Organisations based in Invercargill